Muhammad Ridwan is an (born 8 July 1980) is an Indonesian former professional footballer as a winger. Currently, he works as director of youth department and team manager PSIS Semarang.

Personal life
Ridwan is Muslim and missed part of the 2014 Indonesia Super League because he was making his Hajj pilgrimage in September.

International goals

|}

Honours

Club
PSIS Semarang
Winner

 First Division: 2001

Sriwijaya
Winner

 Indonesia Super League: 2011–12
 Indonesian Community Shield: 2010

Persib Bandung
Winner
 Indonesia Super League: 2014

Sriwijaya
4th place
 Gubernur Kaltim Cup 2016: 2016
3rd place
 Bhayangkara Cup 2016: 2016

National team
Indonesia
Winner
 Indonesian Independence Cup: 2008

References

External links
 

1980 births
Living people
Javanese people
Indonesian Muslims
People from Semarang
Indonesian footballers
Liga 1 (Indonesia) players
2007 AFC Asian Cup players
Indonesia international footballers
Sriwijaya F.C. players
PSIS Semarang players
Pelita Jaya FC players
Persegi Gianyar players
Persib Bandung players
Association football wingers
Indonesian Super League-winning players
Sportspeople from Central Java